Cass Lake is on the main branch of the Clinton River.

Upstream from Cass Lake is 243-acre Loon Lake.  Cass Lake also connects with 363-acre Elizabeth Lake & the small Dow Lake, in Dow Ridge.

Downstream from Cass Lake is the 532-acre Sylvan Lake.

Cass Lake is the largest and deepest lake in Oakland County, and is in the northern Metro Detroit region of southeastern Michigan.

Namesake
Cass Lake was named after former Michigan governor Lewis Cass.

Geography
Cass Lake covers 1,280 acres (5 km2) and has a maximum depth of 123 ft (37 m).

It is bordered by the cities, villages, and townships of Waterford Township, West Bloomfield Township, Orchard Lake Village, and Keego Harbor.

Recreation
It is a popular public lake in the Metro Detroit region.  The lake is home to the Pontiac Yacht Club.

Dodge No. 4 State Park is located on northeastern Cass Lake, with access via West Bloomfield Township and Waterford Township.

See also
List of places named for Lewis Cass
Detroit Finnish Co-operative Summer Camp — had property on Cass Lake also.
List of lakes in Michigan

References

External links
 
  Sail Michigan.org: Cass Lake
  LakePlace.com: Cass Lake map — satellite view link
 Michigan Department of Natural Resources: Map of Dodge No. 4 State Park at Cass Lake
 Michigan Department of Natural Resources: Dodge No. 4 State Park at Cass Lake
 Michigan Department of Natural Resources: Map of Dodge No. 4 State Park

Lakes of Oakland County, Michigan
Tourist attractions in Oakland County, Michigan
Lakes of Michigan
Lakes of Waterford Township, Michigan